is a town located in Ama District, Aichi Prefecture, Japan. , the town had an estimated population of 37,082 in 16,647 households, and a population density of 3,344 persons per km².

Etymology 
The origin of the town's name comes from the once-plentiful  population.

Geography
Kanie is located in the southwest Aichi Prefecture in the extreme end of the Nōbi Plain at the delta of the Kiso River, bordering on Ise Bay to the south. The average elevation of the town is sea level.

Neighboring municipalities
Aichi Prefecture
Nakagawa-ku, Nagoya 
Minato-ku, Nagoya
Tsushima
Aisai
Yatomi
Ama
Tobishima

Demographics
Per Japanese census data, the population of Kanie has been increasing over the past 50 years.

Climate
The town has a climate characterized by hot and humid summers, and relatively mild winters (Köppen climate classification Cfa).  The average annual temperature in Kanie is 15.6 °C. The average annual rainfall is 1678 mm with September as the wettest month. The temperatures are highest on average in August, at around 27.8 °C, and lowest in January, at around 4.4 °C.

History
Kanie was part of ancient Owari Province. During the Sengoku period, it was the site of the Siege of Kanie, where Toyotomi Hideyoshi fought the Oda clan to secure his hold over the province. It was part of the holdings of the Owari Domain under the Edo period Tokugawa shogunate. With the Meiji period establishment of the modern municipalities system on April 1, 1889 the town of Kanie was established. The 1891 Mino–Owari earthquake caused extensive damage to the area. In October 2003, Kanie participated in discussions with regards to a possible merge with neighboring town of Yatomi and village of Jūshiyama. However, negotiations failed in 2004 and Kanie decided to remain as an independent municipality.

Economy
Kanie is primarily a regional commercial center and bedroom community for the Nagoya metropolis.

Education 
Kanie has five public elementary schools and two public junior high schools operated by the town government. The town does not have a high school.

Middle schools
 Kanie Middle School
 Kanie-Kita Middle School
Elementary schools
 Kanie Elementary School
 Funairi Elementary School
 Sunishi Elementary School
 Shin-Kanie Elementary School
 Gakuto Elementary School

Transportation

Railway
 Central Japan Railway Company - Kansai Main Line
  
 Kintetsu Railway – Nagoya Line
  -

Highway

  Higashi-Meihan Expressway

Sister city relations
 - Marion, Illinois, USA, sister cities since March 26, 2010.

Local attractions
 Owari Onsen hot spring
 Sunari Festival

Noted people from Kanie
Kisho Kurokawa, architect
Masahiro Narita, basketball player

References

External links

 Official website 

 
Towns in Aichi Prefecture
Populated coastal places in Japan